Patrick McCartin (born 19 April 1996) is an Australian rules footballer who plays for the Sydney Swans in the Australian Football League (AFL), having previously played for the St Kilda Football Club from 2015 to 2019. He was drafted as the number one pick in the 2014 AFL draft.

AFL career

St Kilda (2015-2019)
McCartin finished his education at Geelong Grammar on a football scholarship after attending St Joseph's College, Geelong from years 7 to 10. He played junior football for the Geelong Falcons in the TAC Cup and Victoria Country at the AFL Under 18 Championships.  

He made his AFL debut in round 3 of the 2015 AFL season in St Kilda's loss against . He was selected as a late replacement for St Kilda captain Nick Riewoldt who pulled out due to a calf injury. McCartin finished the 2015 season with six senior games and three goals to his name. Prior to the 2016 season, he signed a two year contract extension which would keep him at the club until at least the end of the 2018 season.

McCartin's 2016 season was interrupted by injury, including three separate concussions. The first concussion was suffered in St Kilda's Round 3 win against Collingwood at the MCG, which kept him out of the senior team until his return in Round 9 against Essendon. Subsequent concussions were suffered in Round 11 against Adelaide and Round 15 against Gold Coast and finally a collision with Nick Vlastuin of Richmond in Round 22 led to McCartin sustaining a broken collarbone. Due to these injuries, McCartin was restricted to 11 games in 2016, adding 14 goals to his career total.

Playing for St Kilda's VFL affiliate club Sandringham in June 2017, McCartin suffered a further concussion. This was McCartin's 6th concussion in 4 years. He finished 2017 with only 5 senior AFL games.  

McCartin's eighth concussion since 2014 came in a JLT Community Series match against the Western Bulldogs in March 2019. McCartin ultimately did not play a senior game for St Kilda in 2019. He was delisted by St Kilda at the conclusion of the 2019 AFL season to allow him to deal with complications resulting from repeated concussions. St Kilda head of football Simon Lethlean stated that the club would be open to re-adding McCartin to their list after a break in 2020.

Sydney (2021-)
In 2021, McCartin joined the Sydney Swans VFL team. In January 2022, he was signed as a rookie by the Swans as part of the pre-season supplemental selection period. He starred in this game having 22 disposals and 9 intercepts.

Statistics
Updated to the end of the 2022 season.

|-
| 2015 ||  || 32
| 6 || 3 || 5 || 43 || 13 || 56 || 26 || 8 || 0.5 || 0.8 || 7.2 || 2.2 || 9.3 || 4.3 || 1.3
|- 
| 2016 ||  || 32
| 11 || 14 || 6 || 56 || 21 || 77 || 48 || 4 || 1.3 || 0.5 || 5.1 || 1.9 || 7.0 || 4.4 || 0.4
|-
| 2017 ||  || 32
| 5 || 5 || 8 || 40 || 18 || 58 || 23 || 5 || 1.0 || 1.6 || 8.0 || 3.6 || 11.6 || 4.6 || 1.0
|- 
| 2018 ||  || 32
| 13 || 12 || 17 || 91 || 35 || 126 || 62 || 12 || 0.9 || 1.3 || 7.0 || 2.7 || 9.7 || 4.8 || 0.9
|-
| 2019 ||  || 32
| 0 || – || – || – || – || – || – || – || – || – || – || – || – || – || –
|- 
| 2022 ||  || 39
| 24 || 1 || 0 || 229 || 65 || 294 || 121 || 23 || 0.0 || 0.0 || 9.5 || 2.7 || 12.3 || 5.0 || 1.0
|- class=sortbottom
! colspan=3 | Career
! 59 !! 35 !! 36 !! 459 !! 152 !! 611 !! 280 !! 52 !! 0.6 !! 0.6 !! 7.8 !! 2.6 !! 10.4 !! 4.7 !! 0.9
|}

Personal life
His younger brother, Tom, was drafted by the Sydney Swans at pick number 33 in the 2017 AFL draft. The two brothers first played against each other in Round 12 2018 at Docklands Stadium.

At age nine, McCartin was diagnosed with type 1 diabetes.

References

External links

"Five days to the draft: Meet Paddy McCartinMeet Paddy McCartin", AFL website
 

1996 births
Living people
St Kilda Football Club players
Sandringham Football Club players
Geelong Falcons players
Australian rules footballers from Geelong
People educated at Geelong Grammar School
Australian rules footballers from Hobart